Steven Anthony Davis (born 1958/1959-J une 10, 2022) is an American business executive from Milwaukee, Wisconsin, formerly the CEO of Bob Evans Restaurants, and former president of Long John Silver's and A&W Restaurants.

Background 
The youngest of five children of Henry and Dolores Davis, African-Americans in Milwaukee who never had the opportunity to attend a college or university (Dolores had to decline a scholarship to Cardinal Stritch College in order to attend to her sickly mother), Davis graduated from Messmer High School (Milwaukee), and in 1980 received a B.A. in business administration from the University of Wisconsin–Milwaukee (all four of his older siblings had also graduated from UWM). He went on to earn his M.B.A. at the University of Chicago.

Business career 
Davis worked as an executive at Kraft Foods for nine years, and Pizza Hut/YUM! Brands for 14 years. In 2005, Black Enterprise magazine named him one of the "75 Most Powerful Black Men in American Business."

He is on several boards of directors, including those of Marathon Petroleum and Walgreens.

Personal life 
Davis lives in New Albany, Ohio, with his wife Lynnda. They have three daughters.

In 2014, Davis was given the University of Wisconsin–Milwaukee Alumni Association Lifetime Achievement Award. At a November ceremony, it was announced that Davis and his family had funded a scholarship in memory of his parents, to provide support for other first-generation minority university students.

References 

Businesspeople from Milwaukee
American chief executives of food industry companies
University of Chicago Booth School of Business alumni
University of Wisconsin–Milwaukee alumni
Businesspeople from Ohio
African-American business executives
American business executives
People from New Albany, Ohio
Living people
20th-century American businesspeople
Year of birth uncertain
20th-century African-American people
21st-century African-American people
Year of birth missing (living people)